Chascanum is a genus of flowering plants belonging to the family Verbenaceae.

Its native range is Africa to India.

Species:

Chascanum adenostachyum 
Chascanum angolense 
Chascanum caespitosum 
Chascanum cernuum 
Chascanum cuneifolium 
Chascanum elburense 
Chascanum garipense 
Chascanum gillettii 
Chascanum glandulosum 
Chascanum hanningtonii 
Chascanum hederaceum 
Chascanum hildebrandtii 
Chascanum humbertii 
Chascanum hyderabadense 
Chascanum incisum 
Chascanum insulare 
Chascanum integrifolium 
Chascanum krookii 
Chascanum laetum 
Chascanum latifolium 
Chascanum marrubiifolium 
Chascanum mixtum 
Chascanum moldenkei 
Chascanum namaquanum 
Chascanum obovatum 
Chascanum pinnatifidum 
Chascanum pumilum 
Chascanum rariflorum 
Chascanum schlechteri 
Chascanum sessilifolium 
Chascanum sulcatum 
Chascanum yemenense

References

Verbenaceae
Verbenaceae genera